Melalgus is a genus of horned powder-post beetles in the family Bostrichidae. There are more than 20 described species in Melalgus.

Species
These 25 species belong to the genus Melalgus:

 Melalgus amoenus (Lesne, 1911)
 Melalgus batillus (Lesne, 1902)
 Melalgus borneensis (Lesne, 1911)
 Melalgus caribeanus (Lesne, 1906)
 Melalgus confertus (LeConte, 1866) (branch and twig borer)
 Melalgus crassulus (Lesne, 1911)
 Melalgus digueti (Lesne, 1911)
 Melalgus exesus (LeConte, 1858)
 Melalgus feanus (Lesne, 1899)
 Melalgus femoralis (Fabricius, 1792)
 Melalgus gonagrus (Fabricius, 1798)
 Melalgus gracilipes (Blanchard, 1843)
 Melalgus jamaicensis (Lesne, 1906)
 Melalgus japonicum Chûjô, 1973
 Melalgus longitarsus (Lesne, 1911)
 Melalgus megalops (Fall, 1901)
 Melalgus parvidens (Lesne, 1895)
 Melalgus parvulus (Lesne, 1925)
 Melalgus plicatus (LeConte, 1874)
 Melalgus rufipes (Blanchard, 1843)
 Melalgus strigipennis (Lesne, 1937)
 Melalgus subdepressus (Lesne, 1897)
 Melalgus talpula (Lesne, 1911)
 Melalgus truncatus (Guérin-Méneville, 1844)
 Melalgus valleculatus (Lesne, 1913)

References

Further reading

External links

 

Bostrichidae
Articles created by Qbugbot